The Medvezhy Ruchey mine is a large copper mine located in the center of Russia in Krasnoyarsk Krai. Medvezhy Ruchey represents one of the largest copper reserve in Russia and in the world having estimated reserves of 354.7 million tonnes of ore grading 0.39% copper.

References 

Copper mines in Russia